In 1963 the first and only one Special School for Aeronautical and Spatial Medicine in Italy was created out of Center of Studies and Research on Aeronautical Medicine to do research work in the new field of Space activities. In order to test conditions in space, new instruments were developed such as a tower where a state of micro gravity could be attained for a very short period of time, as well as an axis of sub gravity where body movements under micro gravity could be studied. Such studies were all important to determine safety conditions in the first ‘moon-walks’. Because of its relevance in the field of Medicine, it was visited in 1965 by Col. John Glenn, USAF, the first US astronaut to be put in an orbit around the Earth.

Aeronautics organizations
Space science organizations